Denmark is a city in Bamberg County, South Carolina, United States. The population at the 2010 census is 3,538.

Geography
Denmark is located in northwest Bamberg County at  (33.321173, -81.142289). U.S. Route 78 and U.S. Route 321 cross in Denmark just north of the downtown area. US 78 leads east  to Bamberg, the county seat, and west  to Blackville. US 321 leads north  to Norway and south  to Govan.

Demographics

2020 census

As of the 2020 United States census, there were 3,186 people, 972 households, and 518 families residing in the city.

2000 census
As of the census of 2000, there were 3,328 people, 1,331 households, and 846 families residing in the city. The population density was 1,096.0 people per square mile (422.7/km2). There were 1,537 housing units at an average density of 506.2 per square mile (195.2/km2). The racial makeup of the city was 85.91% African American, 12.74% White,  0.09% Native American, 0.51% Asian, 0.06% from other races, and 0.69% from two or more races. Hispanic or Latino of any race were 0.75% of the population.

There were 1,331 households, out of which 29.8% had children under the age of 18 living with them, 30.2% were married couples living together, 27.5% had a female householder with no husband present, and 36.4% were non-families. 32.0% of all households were made up of individuals, and 11.7% had someone living alone who was 65 years of age or older. The average household size was 2.47 and the average family size was 3.15.

In the city, the population was spread out, with 26.8% under the age of 18, 9.7% from 18 to 24, 24.7% from 25 to 44, 24.1% from 45 to 64, and 14.7% who were 65 years of age or older. The median age was 36 years. For every 100 females, there were 85.6 males. For every 100 females age 18 and over, there were 82.6 males.

The median income for a household in the city was $17,578, and the median income for a family was $22,346. Males had a median income of $22,110 versus $13,767 for females. The per capita income for the city was $11,243. About 33.4% of families and 35.2% of the population were below the poverty line, including 51.9% of those under age 18 and 30.8% of those age 65 or over.

History
Cleveland Sellers oral history interview conducted by John Dittmer in Denmark, South Carolina, 2013 March 21.

Cleveland Sellers shares memories of growing up in Denmark, South Carolina, especially the influence of Voorhees College in the community. He organized a Youth Chapter of the National Association for the Advancement of Colored People (NAACP) in Denmark, and he describes the group's activities. He discusses his first impressions of Howard University, where he joined the Nonviolent Action Group (NAG). He shares memories of the March on Washington and the role of students in organizing it, his involvement in the Student Nonviolent Coordinating Committee (SNCC), and his role in the Mississippi Freedom Project. He also describes the goals of the Mississippi Freedom Democratic Party and the tensions that developed within SNCC in the late 1960s.

Denmark was originally called Grahams Turnout, as it was founded in the 1830s for a railroad extension and turnout. It was later renamed after B. A. Denmark, a railroad official.

In April 1893, Mamie Baxter, a fourteen-year-old girl in Denmark, alleged that an African American unknown to her had attempted to attack her. John Peterson, a suspect, appealed to South Carolina Governor Benjamin Tillman for protection, fearing he would be lynched if taken to Denmark, and saying he could prove his innocence. He was taken by the mob, put on "trial" and, after the mob found him guilty, was murdered by hanging.

Shown Peterson before the crowd killed him, Baxter reportedly testified: 
"I don't know him sir, that don't look like him at all. He is the same color, that's all. He don't talk like the man; he is thinner in the face, he was as dark as this man, but his eyes don't look like him."

Historic sites
The American Telephone and Telegraph Company Building, Denmark High School, and the Voorhees College Historic District, part of the campus of the historically black college, are listed on the National Register of Historic Places.

Transport

Amtrak, the national passenger rail system, serves Denmark, operating its Silver Star daily in each direction, between Miami, Florida by way of Tampa, Jacksonville, and Savannah, and New York, New York by way of Columbia, Richmond, Washington, and Philadelphia.

Parks 
 Ceceile Playground and Court
 Simons Davis Park
 The Art Park

Education
Denmark contains two colleges: Denmark Technical College and Voorhees University.

Denmark has a public library, a branch of the ABBE Regional Library System.

Arts and culture 
Denmark is home to the Dog Wood Festival, which is a festival that includes rides, games, and food/drink stands and was originally hosted 517.01 ft (15758.4648 cm [estimated]) from Beech Ave to South Beech Ave, but was moved to Cypress St as of 2019. According to the history of the Dog Wood, it first began in the year of 1985 and still goes on once a year. This usually happens in April on a sunny day. This festival benefits the community.

Each year of the festival visitors region-wide come to Denmark, usually stopping by one of Denmark's retailers and restaurants before or after going to the festival. This has a good effect on the local economy. A restaurant like McDonald's usually has an average of 14 cars located on the property, but on a festival day, locals say that the car population gets boosted by more than half.

Notable people
 Elizabeth Evelyn Wright, founder of Voorhees College.
 Cleveland Sellers, American educator and civil rights activist.
 Bakari Sellers, American attorney and politician. He served in the South Carolina House of Representatives for the 90th District from 2006-2014.
 Ted Potter Jr., PGA Tour Golfer who resided as a child in Denmark.
 Priya Gill, former Indian actress.
 Robert Satcher, American physician, chemical engineer, and NASA astronaut.
 Harvey N. Middleton, American physician who advocated for black physicians' rights.

References

External links
 Denmark Town Hall & Town Council

Cities in South Carolina
Cities in Bamberg County, South Carolina